This is a list of monuments and memorials located in Azov.

Military monuments and memorials
Monument to Heroes of World War I 
Monument to the sailors of the Azov Flotilla

Monuments and memorials to people

Militaries
Monument to Alexander Suvorov

Politicians
Monument to Aleksei Shein
Monument to Peter the Great
Monument to Vladimir Lenin

External links

 List of monuments and memorials in Azov

List of monuments and memorials
Azov
Azov
Azov